Sons of Sylvia, originally known as The Clark Brothers, was an American country pop trio composed of three brothers with the surname Clark: Adam (guitar, mandolin), Ashley (lead vocals, fiddle, mandolin, guitar) and Austin (background vocals, resonator guitar). All three, along with their three other brothers Aaron, Andrew, and Alan, originally comprised a sextet called The Clark Family Experience. Sons of Sylvia released its debut album in April 2010.

History
Brothers Adam, Ashley, Austin, Aaron, Andrew, and Alan Clark, natives of Rocky Mount, Virginia, founded a family band in the late 1990s called The Clark Family Experience. The band recorded one album for Curb Records in 2000 and charted in the Top 20 on the Billboard country singles charts with "Meanwhile Back at the Ranch." The Clark Family Experience disbanded in 2002 after filing for Chapter 7 bankruptcy.

In 2007, Adam, Ashley, and Austin began playing as The Clark Brothers. Under this name, the trio won the top prize in the Fox Networks talent competition The Next Great American Band, and subsequently signed to 19 Recordings. The band renamed itself Sons of Sylvia in October 2009.

Sons of Sylvia appeared on the song "What Can I Say" on Carrie Underwood's third album, Play On. The band had a connection with Underwood through Ashley, who toured with Carrie as her fiddle player from 2005-2009. The band performed "What Can I Say" with Carrie Underwood on December 7, 2009, on Carrie Underwood: An All Star Holiday Special. Sons of Sylvia also joined Carrie on her 2010 "Play On Tour".  The band performed their debut single, "Love Left to Lose," on the April 28, 2010 results show episode of American Idol and were introduced by Carrie Underwood.

The group are cousins to Ryan Tedder, lead singer for OneRepublic, who co-wrote and produced the group's debut single, "Love Left to Lose". The album's second single, "I'll Know You", was released to radio in late 2010 but did not chart. In February 2012, Sons Of Sylvia were dropped from Interscope Records. Ashley signed with I.R.S. Records as a solo artist in 2015. As fate would have it Ashley Clark got dropped, when I.R.S. Records ceased trading in mid December 2015.

Discography

Studio albums

Singles

Music videos

Other appearances

References

External links
Official website
Street team

Country music groups from Virginia
Family musical groups
Sibling musical trios
Musical groups from Virginia
Musical groups established in 2007
Show Dog-Universal Music artists
Interscope Records artists
19 Recordings artists